The 1904 Swarthmore Quakers football team was an American football team that represented Swarthmore College as an independent during the 1904 college football season. The team compiled a 6–3 record and outscored their opponents by a total of 187 to 28. George H. Brooke was the head coach

The team featured drop kicker Wilmer G. Crowell. He made a 40-yard field goal against Lehigh, and 55-yard and 48-yard field goals against Franklin & Marshall.

Schedule

References

Swarthmore
Swarthmore Garnet Tide football seasons
Swarthmore Quakers football